is a Japanese video game composer.

Biography
Iwadare was born in Matsumoto City, Nagano Prefecture, Japan. He began to compose video game music after years of being involved with university bands. He began composing for Toaplan, arranging their arcade video game soundtracks for their Sega Mega Drive home console ports, notably the Mega Drive version of Zero Wing (1990), before composing for other companies such as Game Arts on their Lunar and Grandia series.

The first award he won was the Best Game Music award, the Mega Drive/Genesis category for Lunar: The Silver Star in 1991. He also won the Best Game Music award in the Sega Saturn Music category for Grandia in 1997 and in the Dreamcast category for Grandia 2 in 2000. Iwadare first composed music for Tokyo Disney Resort, in addition to Japanese dance programs, television programs, and radio programs. He dreams to have orchestral arrangements of his musical works, which he himself has done several times, as with the Gyakuten Meets Orchestra arrangements (orchestral arrangements of the Ace Attorney series music).

He was a special guest at the 11th French Japan Expo that was held on July 2010 in Paris.

Works

Composition 

Space Invaders: Fukkatsu no Hi (1990)
Space Invaders '90 (1990)
Zero Wing (1990) - Mega Drive version (arranged)
Wings of Wor (1991)
Langrisser (1991) - with Hiroshi Fujioka and Isao Mizoguchi
Blue Almanac (1991) - with Masaru Suzuki, Yoshiaki Kubotera, Hiroshi Fujioka, and Isao Mizoguchi
Head Buster (1991) - with Hiroshi Fujioka and Isao Mizoguchi
Parasol Stars (1991)
Steel Empire (1992) - with Isao Mizoguchi and Yoshiaki Kubotera
Sotsugyou: Graduation (1992)
Gley Lancer (1992) - with Masanori Hikichi, Yoshiaki Kubotera, and Isao Mizoguchi
Lunar: The Silver Star (1992) - with Hiroshi Fujioka, Isao Mizoguchi, and Yoshiaki Kubotera
Kishi Densetsu (1993) - with Isao Mizoguchi
Maten no Soumetsu (1993) - with Isao Mizoguchi
SimEarth (Sega CD) (1993)
Tanjou: Debut (1993)
Langrisser: Hikari no Matsuei (1993) - with Masanori Hikichi, Hiroshi Fujioka, Isao Mizoguchi, Miyoko Takaoka, Naoyuki Ito
Alien vs Predator: The Last of His Clan (1993)
Langrisser II (1994) - with Isao Mizoguchi
Wing Commander (Sega CD) (1994) - with Isao Mizoguchi, Kenichi Okuma, Maki Tanimoto
Lunar: Eternal Blue (1994)
Sotsugyou II: Neo Generation (1994) - with Maki Tanimoto, Kenichi Okuma, Isao Mizoguchi
Mighty Morphin Power Rangers: The Movie (Game Boy) (1994) - with Kenichi Okuma
Mercurius Pretty (1994)
Der Langrisser (1995)
Dōkyūsei (TG-CD) (1995) - "Opening Theme" - with Go Oami, Hiroyuki Hamada, Kenichi Okuma, Masaki Sugo, Tatsuro Yamashita, Yoshiyuki Kadooka
Lunar: Walking School (1996)
Monstania (1996)
Tanjou S (1996)
Lunar: Silver Star Story (1996)
Doukyuusei if (1996) - "Opening Theme"
True Love Story (1996) - with Kenichi Okuma, Maki Tanimoto, Ataru Sumiyoshi
Doukyuusei 2 (Sega Saturn) (1997) - "Opening Theme" - with Go Oami, Isao Mizoguchi, Taro Hara
Langrisser IV (1997) - with Makoto Asai, Yuichiro Honda
Magic School Lunar! (1997)
Grandia (1997)
Langrisser V: The End of Legend (1998)
Lunar 2: Eternal Blue (1998)
True Love Story 2 (1999)
Yuukyuu no Eden (1999)
Growlanser (1999)
Grandia II (2000)
Mercurius Pretty: End of the Century (2000)
True Love Story 3 (2001)
Grandia Xtreme (2002)
Wind: A Breath of Heart (2002) - with Maki Tanimoto
True Love Story: Summer Days, and Yet… (2003)
Mega Man X7 (2003) ("Higher The Air ~ Air Force Stage")
Phoenix Wright: Ace Attorney − Trials and Tribulations (2004)
Radiata Stories (2005)
Grandia III (2006)
KimiKiss (2006)
Project Wiki (2006)
Kanji no Wataridori (2006)
Elvandia Story (2007) - with Norihiko Hibino
KimiKiss: Pure Rouge (2007) - with Hikaru Nanase and Masaru Yokoyama
True Fortune (2008)
Amagami (2009)
Ace Attorney Investigations: Miles Edgeworth (2009) - with Yasuko Yamada
Lunar: Silver Star Harmony (2009)
Grandia Online (2010)
Ace Attorney Investigations 2 (2011)
Otomedius Excellent (2011) - with various others
Kid Icarus: Uprising (2012) - with Motoi Sakuraba, Yuzo Koshiro, Masafumi Takada, Takahiro Nishi, and Yasunori Mitsuda
Phoenix Wright: Ace Attorney - Dual Destinies (2013)
Langrisser Re:Incarnation Tensei (2015)
Zombie Tokyo (2015) - composition with Michiko Naruke
Phoenix Wright: Ace Attorney − Spirit of Justice (2016) - with Toshihiko Horiyama and Masami Onodera
Reco Love: Blue Ocean and Gold Beach (2016)
Langrisser (Android) (2019)
Rakugaki Kingdom (2019) - with various others
Ninjala (2020) - with various others
Loop8: Summer of Gods (2023)
Project MBR (2024)

Arrangement 
After Burner II (Mega Drive) (1990)
Ys III: Wanderers from Ys (Mega Drive) (1991) - with Yoshiaki Kubodera
Urusei Yatsura: Dear My Friends (Mega-CD) (1994)
Crusader of Centy (1994)
Super Smash Bros. Brawl (2008) - with various others ("Yoshi's Island" from Yoshi's Island, "Meta Knight's Revenge" from Kirby Super Star, "With Mila's Divine Protection" from Fire Emblem Gaiden)
Super Smash Bros. for Nintendo 3DS and Wii U (2014) - with various others ("Gear Getaway" from Donkey Kong Country Returns, "In the Space-Pirate Ship" from Kid Icarus: Uprising, "Air Man Stage" from Mega Man 2)
Super Smash Bros. Ultimate (2018) - with various others ("City Trial" from Kirby Air Ride, "Delfino Plaza" from Super Mario Sunshine, "Top Man Stage" from Mega Man 3, "Light Plane" from Pilotwings, "Electroplankton" from Electroplankton, "Kurikinton"  from Fatal Fury 2, "Stormy Saxophone 2" from The King of Fighters '96)

References

External links

Noriyuki Iwadare's official English website

1964 births
Freelance musicians
Japanese composers
Japanese male composers
Living people
Lunar (series)
Musicians from Nagano Prefecture
People from Matsumoto, Nagano
Video game composers